Herbert Grohs (4 May 1931 – 7 April 2018) was an Austrian football forward who played for Austria. He also played for Grazer SC, SC Schwechat, First Vienna FC, SV Austria Salzburg and SC Wacker Wien. He also competed in the men's tournament at the 1952 Summer Olympics.

References

External links
 
 
 Mention of Herbert Grohs' death at EU Football

1931 births
2018 deaths
Austrian footballers
Austria international footballers
Association football forwards
First Vienna FC players
FC Red Bull Salzburg players
FC Admira Wacker Mödling players
Olympic footballers of Austria 
Footballers at the 1952 Summer Olympics